Isavia ohf. is the national airport and air navigation service provider of Iceland. The company operates all public airports and air navigation services in a vast area in the north-eastern Atlantic. The company headquarters is at Reykjavík Airport in Reykjavík.

History
The enterprise was founded in 1945 as the Icelandic Civil Aviation Administration (Flugmálastjórn Íslands).  With the creation of the government enterprise Flugstodir ltd. in 2006, the operational services were separated from the regulatory authority of the Icelandic Civil Aviation Administration. 31 January 2010 Flugstodir and Keflavik International Airport Ltd. were merged into a private limited company with 100 per cent state ownership, Isavia ltd.

Airports
Isavia operates all public airports in Iceland. A total of 2,165,423 international passengers and 781,357 domestic passengers passed through these airports in 2011.
Akureyri Airport
Bakki Airport
Bíldudalur Airport
Egilsstaðir Airport
Gjögur Airport
Grímsey Airport
Hornafjörður Airport
Keflavík Airport
Reykjavík Airport
Sauðárkrókur Airport
Þingeyri Airport
Húsavík Airport
Þórshöfn Airport
Vestmannaeyjar Airport
Vopnafjörður Airport

References

External links

  Isavia, official web site
  Isavia, official web site

Airport operators
Transport companies of Iceland
Air navigation service providers
Companies based in Reykjavík